Ramezan Bijar (also Romanized as Rameẕān Bījār) is a village in Layl Rural District, in the Central District of Lahijan County, Gilan Province, Iran. At the 2006 census, its population was 23, in 7 families.

References 

Populated places in Lahijan County